Noam David Elkies (born August 25, 1966) is a professor of mathematics at Harvard University. At the age of 26, he became the youngest professor to receive tenure at Harvard. He is also a pianist, chess national master and a chess composer.

Early life
Elkies was born to an engineer father and a piano teacher mother. He attended Stuyvesant High School in New York City for three years before graduating in 1982 at age 15. A child prodigy in 1981, at age 14, he was awarded a gold medal at the 22nd International Mathematical Olympiad, receiving a perfect score of 42, one of the youngest to ever do so. He went on to Columbia University, where he won the Putnam competition at the age of sixteen years and four months, making him one of the youngest Putnam Fellows in history. He was a Putnam Fellow two more times during his undergraduate years. He graduated valedictorian of his class in 1985. He then earned his PhD in 1987 under the supervision of Benedict Gross and Barry Mazur at Harvard University.

From 1987 to 1990 he was a junior fellow of the Harvard Society of Fellows.

Work in mathematics
In 1987, he proved that an elliptic curve over the rational numbers is supersingular at infinitely many primes.  In 1988, he found a counterexample to Euler's sum of powers conjecture for fourth powers. His work on these and other problems won him recognition and a position as an associate professor at Harvard in 1990. In 1993, he was made a full, tenured professor at the age of 26. This made him the youngest full professor in the history of Harvard. Along with A. O. L. Atkin he extended Schoof's algorithm to create the Schoof–Elkies–Atkin algorithm.

Elkies also studies the connections between music and mathematics; he is on the advisory board of the Journal of Mathematics and Music. He has discovered many new patterns in Conway's Game of Life and has studied the mathematics of still life patterns in that cellular automaton rule. Elkies is an associate of Harvard's Lowell House.

Elkies is one of the principal investigators of the Simons Collaboration on Arithmetic Geometry, Number Theory, and Computation, a large multi-university collaboration involving Boston University, Brown, Dartmouth, Harvard, and MIT.

Elkies is the discoverer (or joint-discoverer) of many current and past record-holding elliptic curves, including the curve with the highest-known lower bound (≥28) on its rank, and the curve with the highest-known exact rank (=20).

Music
Elkies is a bass-baritone and plays the piano for the Harvard Glee Club. Jameson N. Marvin, former director of the Glee Club, compared him to "a Bach or a Mozart," citing "[h]is gifted musicality, superior musicianship and sight-reading ability."

Chess
Elkies is a composer and solver of chess problems (winning the 1996 World Chess Solving Championship). One of his problems is used by the famed chess trainer Mark Dvoretsky in his book "Dvoretsky's Endgame Manual". He holds the title of National Master from the United States Chess Federation, but he no longer plays competitively.

Awards and honors
In 1994 he was an invited speaker at the International Congress of Mathematicians in Zurich. In 2004 he received a Lester R. Ford Award
and the Levi L. Conant Prize.
In 2017 he was elected to the National Academy of Sciences.

References

External links

 Personal site of Noam Elkies at Harvard University
 Endgame Explorations – an 11-part series of articles by Noam Elkies in Chess Horizons

1966 births
Living people
20th-century American mathematicians
21st-century American mathematicians
Stuyvesant High School alumni
Putnam Fellows
Harvard Fellows
Columbia College (New York) alumni
Harvard University alumni
Harvard University faculty
Cellular automatists
Chess composers
International Mathematical Olympiad participants
International solving grandmasters
Members of the United States National Academy of Sciences
Mathematicians from New York (state)
Number theorists